Coleophora hancola is a moth of the family Coleophoridae. It is found in Japan.

The wingspan is about 12 mm.

The larvae feed on Alnus japonica. They create a grey-brownish, somewhat tubular leaf-case of about 5 mm in length with short dorsal keel. They mine into the leaf of their host plant until October, and passes winter in full-grown stage within the case fastened on the twig.

References

hancola
Moths described in 1965
Moths of Japan